This is a list of the bird species recorded in Malawi. The avifauna of Malawi include a total of 683 species, of which 2 have been introduced by humans. 1 species is endemic.

This list's taxonomic treatment (designation and sequence of orders, families and species) and nomenclature (common and scientific names) follow the conventions of The Clements Checklist of Birds of the World, 2022 edition. The family accounts at the beginning of each heading reflect this taxonomy, as do the species counts found in each family account. Introduced and accidental species are included in the total counts for Malawi.

The following tags have been used to highlight several categories, but not all species fall into one of these categories. Those that do not are commonly occurring native species.

(A) Accidental - a rarely occurring species in Malawi
(E) Endemic - a species endemic to Malawi
(I) Introduced - a species introduced to Malawi as a consequence, direct or indirect, of human actions
(Ex) Extirpated - a species that no longer occurs in Malawi although populations exist elsewhere

Ducks, geese, and waterfowl
Order: AnseriformesFamily: Anatidae

Anatidae includes the ducks and most duck-like waterfowl, such as geese and swans. These birds are adapted to an aquatic existence with webbed feet, flattened bills, and feathers that are excellent at shedding water due to an oily coating.

White-faced whistling-duck, Dendrocygna viduata
Fulvous whistling-duck, Dendrocygna bicolor
White-backed duck, Thalassornis leuconotus
Knob-billed duck, Sarkidiornis melanotos
Egyptian goose, Alopochen aegyptiacus
Spur-winged goose, Plectropterus gambensis
African pygmy-goose, Nettapus auritus
Garganey, Spatula querquedula
Blue-billed teal, Spatula hottentota
Northern shoveler, Spatula clypeata (A)
African black duck, Anas sparsa
Yellow-billed duck, Anas undulata
Cape teal, Anas capensis (A)
Red-billed duck, Anas erythrorhyncha
Northern pintail, Anas acuta (A)
Southern pochard, Netta erythrophthalma
Tufted duck, Aythya fuligula (A)
Maccoa duck, Oxyura maccoa (A)

Guineafowl
Order: GalliformesFamily: Numididae

Guineafowl are a group of African, seed-eating, ground-nesting birds that resemble partridges, but with featherless heads and spangled grey plumage.

Helmeted guineafowl, Numida meleagris
Southern crested guineafowl, Guttera edouardi

Pheasants, grouse, and allies
Order: GalliformesFamily: Phasianidae

The Phasianidae are a family of terrestrial birds which consists of quails, partridges, snowcocks, francolins, spurfowls, tragopans, monals, pheasants, peafowls and jungle fowls. In general, they are plump (although they vary in size) and have broad, relatively short wings.

Crested francolin, Ortygornis sephaena
Coqui francolin, Campocolinus coqui
Red-winged francolin, Scleroptila levaillantii
Shelley's francolin, Scleroptila shelleyi
Whyte’s francolin, Scleroptila whytei
Blue quail, Synoicus adansonii
Common quail, Coturnix coturnix
Harlequin quail, Coturnix delegorguei
Hildebrandt's francolin, Pternistis hildebrandti
Scaly francolin, Pternistis squamatus
Swainson's francolin, Pternistis swainsonii
Red-necked spurfowl, Pternistis afer

Flamingos
Order: PhoenicopteriformesFamily: Phoenicopteridae

Flamingos filter-feed on shellfish and algae. Their oddly shaped beaks are specially adapted to separate mud and silt from the food they consume and, uniquely, are used upside-down.

Greater flamingo, Phoenicopterus roseus
Lesser flamingo, Phoenicopterus minor

Grebes
Order: PodicipediformesFamily: Podicipedidae

Grebes are small to medium-large freshwater diving birds. They have lobed toes and are excellent swimmers and divers. However, they have their feet placed far back on the body, making them quite ungainly on land.

Little grebe, Tachybaptus ruficollis

Pigeons and doves
Order: ColumbiformesFamily: Columbidae

Pigeons and doves are stout-bodied birds with short necks and short slender bills with a fleshy cere.

Rock pigeon, Columba livia (I)
Speckled pigeon, Columba guinea
Rameron pigeon, Columba arquatrix
Delegorgue's pigeon, Columba delegorguei
Lemon dove, Columba larvata
Dusky turtle-dove, Streptopelia lugens
Mourning collared-dove, Streptopelia decipiens
Red-eyed dove, Streptopelia semitorquata
Ring-necked dove, Streptopelia capicola
Laughing dove, Streptopelia senegalensis
Emerald-spotted wood-dove, Turtur chalcospilos
Blue-spotted wood-dove, Turtur afer
Tambourine dove, Turtur tympanistria
Namaqua dove, Oena capensis
African green-pigeon, Treron calva

Sandgrouse
Order: PterocliformesFamily: Pteroclidae

Sandgrouse have small, pigeon like heads and necks, but sturdy compact bodies. They have long pointed wings and sometimes tails and a fast direct flight. Flocks fly to watering holes at dawn and dusk. Their legs are feathered down to the toes.

Double-banded sandgrouse, Pterocles bicinctus

Bustards
Order: OtidiformesFamily: Otididae

Bustards are large terrestrial birds mainly associated with dry open country and steppes in the Old World. They are omnivorous and nest on the ground. They walk steadily on strong legs and big toes, pecking for food as they go. They have long broad wings with "fingered" wingtips and striking patterns in flight. Many have interesting mating displays.

Denham's bustard, Neotis denhami
Black-bellied bustard, Lissotis melanogaster

Turacos
Order: CuculiformesFamily: Musophagidae

The turacos, plantain eaters and go-away-birds make up the bird family Musophagidae. They are medium-sized arboreal birds. The turacos and plantain eaters are brightly coloured, usually in blue, green or purple. The go-away birds are mostly grey and white.

Livingstone's turaco, Tauraco livingstonii
Schalow's turaco, Tauraco schalowi
Purple-crested turaco, Tauraco porphyreolophus
Bare-faced go-away-bird, Corythaixoides personatus
Gray go-away-bird, Corythaixoides concolor

Cuckoos
Order: CuculiformesFamily: Cuculidae

The family Cuculidae includes cuckoos, roadrunners and anis. These birds are of variable size with slender bodies, long tails and strong legs. The Old World cuckoos are brood parasites.

Senegal coucal, Centropus senegalensis
Coppery-tailed coucal, Centropus cupreicaudus
White-browed coucal, Centropus superciliosus
Black coucal, Centropus grillii
Green malkoha, Ceuthmochares australis
Great spotted cuckoo, Clamator glandarius
Levaillant's cuckoo, Clamator levaillantii
Pied cuckoo, Clamator jacobinus
Thick-billed cuckoo, Pachycoccyx audeberti
Dideric cuckoo, Chrysococcyx caprius
Klaas's cuckoo, Chrysococcyx klaas
African emerald cuckoo, Chrysococcyx cupreus
Barred long-tailed cuckoo, Cercococcyx montanus
Black cuckoo, Cuculus clamosus
Red-chested cuckoo, Cuculus solitarius
Lesser cuckoo, Cuculus poliocephalus
African cuckoo, Cuculus gularis
Madagascar cuckoo, Cuculus rochii (A)
Common cuckoo, Cuculus canorus

Nightjars and allies
Order: CaprimulgiformesFamily: Caprimulgidae

Nightjars are medium-sized nocturnal birds that usually nest on the ground. They have long wings, short legs and very short bills. Most have small feet, of little use for walking, and long pointed wings. Their soft plumage is camouflaged to resemble bark or leaves.

Pennant-winged nightjar, Caprimulgus vexillarius
Eurasian nightjar, Caprimulgus europaeus
Fiery-necked nightjar, Caprimulgus pectoralis
Montane nightjar, Caprimulgus poliocephalus
Freckled nightjar, Caprimulgus tristigma
Square-tailed nightjar, Caprimulgus fossii

Swifts
Order: CaprimulgiformesFamily: Apodidae

Swifts are small birds which spend the majority of their lives flying. These birds have very short legs and never settle voluntarily on the ground, perching instead only on vertical surfaces. Many swifts have long swept-back wings which resemble a crescent or boomerang.

Mottled spinetail, Telacanthura ussheri (A)
Bat-like spinetail, Neafrapus boehmi (A)
Scarce swift, Schoutedenapus myoptilus
Alpine swift, Apus melba
Mottled swift, Apus aequatorialis
Common swift, Apus apus
African swift, Apus barbatus
Little swift, Apus affinis
Horus swift, Apus horus
White-rumped swift, Apus caffer
African palm-swift, Cypsiurus parvus

Flufftails
Order: GruiformesFamily: Sarothruridae

The flufftails are a small family of ground-dwelling birds found only in Madagascar and sub-Saharan Africa.

Buff-spotted flufftail, Sarothrura elegans
Red-chested flufftail, Sarothrura rufa
Chestnut-headed flufftail, Sarothrura lugens (A)
Streaky-breasted flufftail, Sarothrura boehmi
Striped flufftail, Sarothrura affinis

Rails, gallinules and coots
Order: GruiformesFamily: Rallidae

Rallidae is a large family of small to medium-sized birds which includes the rails, crakes, coots and gallinules. Typically they inhabit dense vegetation in damp environments near lakes, swamps or rivers. In general they are shy and secretive birds, making them difficult to observe. Most species have strong legs and long toes which are well adapted to soft uneven surfaces. They tend to have short, rounded wings and to be weak fliers.

African rail, Rallus caerulescens
Corn crake, Crex crex
African crake, Crex egregia
Spotted crake, Porzana porzana
Lesser moorhen, Gallinula angulata
Eurasian moorhen, Gallinula chloropus
Red-knobbed coot, Fulica cristata
Allen's gallinule, Porphyrio alleni
African swamphen, Porphyrio madagascariensis
Striped crake, Amaurornis marginalis
Black crake, Zapornia flavirostra
Baillon's crake, Zapornia pusilla

Finfoots
Order: GruiformesFamily: Heliornithidae

Heliornithidae is a small family of tropical birds with webbed lobes on their feet similar to those of grebes and coots.

African finfoot, Podica senegalensis

Cranes
Order: GruiformesFamily: Gruidae

Cranes are large, long-legged and long-necked birds. Unlike the similar-looking but unrelated herons, cranes fly with necks outstretched, not pulled back. Most have elaborate and noisy courting displays or "dances".

Gray crowned-crane, Balearica regulorum
Wattled crane, Bugeranus carunculatus

Thick-knees
Order: CharadriiformesFamily: Burhinidae

The thick-knees are a group of largely tropical waders in the family Burhinidae. They are found worldwide within the tropical zone, with some species also breeding in temperate Europe and Australia. They are medium to large waders with strong black or yellow-black bills, large yellow eyes and cryptic plumage. Despite being classed as waders, most species have a preference for arid or semi-arid habitats.

Water thick-knee, Burhinus vermiculatus
Spotted thick-knee, Burhinus capensis

Stilts and avocets
Order: CharadriiformesFamily: Recurvirostridae

Recurvirostridae is a family of large wading birds, which includes the avocets and stilts. The avocets have long legs and long up-curved bills. The stilts have extremely long legs and long, thin, straight bills.

Black-winged stilt, Himantopus himantopus
Pied avocet, Recurvirostra avosetta

Plovers and lapwings
Order: CharadriiformesFamily: Charadriidae

The family Charadriidae includes the plovers, dotterels and lapwings. They are small to medium-sized birds with compact bodies, short, thick necks and long, usually pointed, wings. They are found in open country worldwide, mostly in habitats near water.

Black-bellied plover, Pluvialis squatarola
Pacific golden-plover, Pluvialis fulva (A)
Long-toed lapwing, Vanellus crassirostris
Blacksmith lapwing, Vanellus armatus
Spur-winged lapwing, Vanellus spinosus
White-headed lapwing, Vanellus albiceps
Senegal lapwing, Vanellus lugubris
Crowned lapwing, Vanellus coronatus
Wattled lapwing, Vanellus senegallus
Greater sand-plover, Charadrius leschenaultii (A)
Caspian plover, Charadrius asiaticus
Kittlitz's plover, Charadrius pecuarius
Common ringed plover, Charadrius hiaticula
Three-banded plover, Charadrius tricollaris
White-fronted plover, Charadrius marginatus

Painted-snipes
Order: CharadriiformesFamily: Rostratulidae

Painted-snipes are short-legged, long-billed birds similar in shape to the true snipes, but more brightly coloured.

Greater painted-snipe, Rostratula benghalensis

Jacanas
Order: CharadriiformesFamily: Jacanidae

The jacanas are a group of tropical waders in the family Jacanidae. They are found throughout the tropics. They are identifiable by their huge feet and claws which enable them to walk on floating vegetation in the shallow lakes that are their preferred habitat.

Lesser jacana, Microparra capensis
African jacana, Actophilornis africanus

Sandpipers and allies
Order: CharadriiformesFamily: Scolopacidae

Scolopacidae is a large diverse family of small to medium-sized shorebirds including the sandpipers, curlews, godwits, shanks, tattlers, woodcocks, snipes, dowitchers and phalaropes. The majority of these species eat small invertebrates picked out of the mud or soil. Variation in length of legs and bills enables multiple species to feed in the same habitat, particularly on the coast, without direct competition for food.

Whimbrel, Numenius phaeopus
Eurasian curlew, Numenius arquata
Bar-tailed godwit, Limosa lapponica
Black-tailed godwit, Limosa limosa (A)
Ruddy turnstone, Arenaria interpres
Ruff, Calidris pugnax
Broad-billed sandpiper, Calidris falcinellus (A)
Curlew sandpiper, Calidris ferruginea
Sanderling, Calidris alba
Little stint, Calidris minuta
Great snipe, Gallinago media
Common snipe, Gallinago gallinago (A)
African snipe, Gallinago nigripennis
Terek sandpiper, Xenus cinereus
Common sandpiper, Actitis hypoleucos
Green sandpiper, Tringa ochropus
Spotted redshank, Tringa erythropus (A)
Common greenshank, Tringa nebularia
Marsh sandpiper, Tringa stagnatilis
Wood sandpiper, Tringa glareola
Common redshank, Tringa totanus

Buttonquail
Order: CharadriiformesFamily: Turnicidae

The buttonquail are small, drab, running birds which resemble the true quails. The female is the brighter of the sexes and initiates courtship. The male incubates the eggs and tends the young.

Small buttonquail, Turnix sylvaticus
Black-rumped buttonquail, Turnix nanus

Pratincoles and coursers
Order: CharadriiformesFamily: Glareolidae

Glareolidae is a family of wading birds comprising the pratincoles, which have short legs, long pointed wings and long forked tails, and the coursers, which have long legs, short wings and long, pointed bills which curve downwards.

Temminck's courser, Cursorius temminckii
Bronze-winged courser, Rhinoptilus chalcopterus
Collared pratincole, Glareola pratincola
Black-winged pratincole, Glareola nordmanni (A)
Rock pratincole, Glareola nuchalis

Gulls, terns, and skimmers
Order: CharadriiformesFamily: Laridae

Laridae is a family of medium to large seabirds, the gulls, terns, and skimmers. Gulls are typically grey or white, often with black markings on the head or wings. They have stout, longish bills and webbed feet. Terns are a group of generally medium to large seabirds typically with grey or white plumage, often with black markings on the head. Most terns hunt fish by diving but some pick insects off the surface of fresh water. Terns are generally long-lived birds, with several species known to live in excess of 30 years. Skimmers are a small family of tropical tern-like birds. They have an elongated lower mandible which they use to feed by flying low over the water surface and skimming the water for small fish.

Gray-hooded gull, Chroicocephalus cirrocephalus
Black-headed gull, Chroicocephalus ridibundus (A)
Lesser black-backed gull, Larus fuscus
Sooty tern, Onychoprion fuscatus (A)
Gull-billed tern, Gelochelidon nilotica
White-winged tern, Chlidonias leucopterus
Whiskered tern, Chlidonias hybrida
Common tern, Sterna hirundo (A)
African skimmer, Rynchops flavirostris

Storks
Order: CiconiiformesFamily: Ciconiidae

Storks are large, long-legged, long-necked, wading birds with long, stout bills. Storks are mute, but bill-clattering is an important mode of communication at the nest. Their nests can be large and may be reused for many years. Many species are migratory.

African openbill, Anastomus lamelligerus
Black stork, Ciconia nigra
Abdim's stork, Ciconia abdimii
African woolly-necked stork, Ciconia microscelis
White stork, Ciconia ciconia
Saddle-billed stork, Ephippiorhynchus senegalensis
Marabou stork, Leptoptilos crumenifer
Yellow-billed stork, Mycteria ibis

Anhingas
Order: SuliformesFamily: Anhingidae

Anhingas or darters are often called "snake-birds" because of their long thin neck, which gives a snake-like appearance when they swim with their bodies submerged. The males have black and dark-brown plumage, an erectile crest on the nape and a larger bill than the female. The females have much paler plumage especially on the neck and underparts. The darters have completely webbed feet and their legs are short and set far back on the body. Their plumage is somewhat permeable, like that of cormorants, and they spread their wings to dry after diving.

African darter, Anhinga rufa

Cormorants and shags
Order: SuliformesFamily: Phalacrocoracidae

Phalacrocoracidae is a family of medium to large coastal, fish-eating seabirds that includes cormorants and shags. Plumage colouration varies, with the majority having mainly dark plumage, some species being black-and-white and a few being colourful.

Long-tailed cormorant, Microcarbo africanus
Great cormorant, Phalacrocorax carbo

Pelicans
Order: PelecaniformesFamily: Pelecanidae

Pelicans are large water birds with a distinctive pouch under their beak. As with other members of the order Pelecaniformes, they have webbed feet with four toes.

Great white pelican, Pelecanus onocrotalus
Pink-backed pelican, Pelecanus rufescens

Hamerkop
Order: PelecaniformesFamily: Scopidae

The hamerkop is a medium-sized bird with a long shaggy crest. The shape of its head with a curved bill and crest at the back is reminiscent of a hammer, hence its name. Its plumage is drab-brown all over.

Hamerkop, Scopus umbretta

Herons, egrets, and bitterns
Order: PelecaniformesFamily: Ardeidae

The family Ardeidae contains the bitterns, herons and egrets. Herons and egrets are medium to large wading birds with long necks and legs. Bitterns tend to be shorter necked and more wary. Members of Ardeidae fly with their necks retracted, unlike other long-necked birds such as storks, ibises and spoonbills.

Little bittern, Ixobrychus minutus
Dwarf bittern, Ixobrychus sturmii
Gray heron, Ardea cinerea
Black-headed heron, Ardea melanocephala
Goliath heron, Ardea goliath
Purple heron, Ardea purpurea
Great egret, Ardea alba
Intermediate egret, Ardea intermedia
Little egret, Egretta garzetta
Black heron, Egretta ardesiaca
Cattle egret, Bubulcus ibis
Squacco heron, Ardeola ralloides
Malagasy pond-heron, Ardeola idae
Rufous-bellied heron, Ardeola rufiventris
Striated heron, Butorides striata
Black-crowned night-heron, Nycticorax nycticorax
White-backed night-heron, Gorsachius leuconotus

Ibises and spoonbills
Order: PelecaniformesFamily: Threskiornithidae

Threskiornithidae is a family of large terrestrial and wading birds which includes the ibises and spoonbills. They have long, broad wings with 11 primary and about 20 secondary feathers. They are strong fliers and despite their size and weight, very capable soarers.

Glossy ibis, Plegadis falcinellus
African sacred ibis, Threskiornis aethiopicus
Hadada ibis, Bostrychia hagedash
African spoonbill, Platalea alba

Secretarybird
Order: AccipitriformesFamily: Sagittariidae

The secretarybird is a bird of prey in the order Accipitriformes but is easily distinguished from other raptors by its long crane-like legs.

Secretarybird, Sagittarius serpentarius

Osprey
Order: AccipitriformesFamily: Pandionidae

The family Pandionidae contains only one species, the osprey. The osprey is a medium-large raptor which is a specialist fish-eater with a worldwide distribution.

Osprey, Pandion haliaetus

Hawks, eagles, and kites
Order: AccipitriformesFamily: Accipitridae

Accipitridae is a family of birds of prey, which includes hawks, eagles, kites, harriers and Old World vultures. These birds have powerful hooked beaks for tearing flesh from their prey, strong legs, powerful talons and keen eyesight.

Black-winged kite, Elanus caeruleus
African harrier-hawk, Polyboroides typus
Palm-nut vulture, Gypohierax angolensis
Egyptian vulture, Neophron percnopterus
European honey-buzzard, Pernis apivorus
African cuckoo-hawk, Aviceda cuculoides
White-headed vulture, Trigonoceps occipitalis
Lappet-faced vulture, Torgos tracheliotos
Hooded vulture, Necrosyrtes monachus
White-backed vulture, Gyps africanus
Bateleur, Terathopius ecaudatus
Black-chested snake-eagle, Circaetus pectoralis
Brown snake-eagle, Circaetus cinereus
Banded snake-eagle, Circaetus cinerascens
Bat hawk, Macheiramphus alcinus
Crowned eagle, Stephanoaetus coronatus
Martial eagle, Polemaetus bellicosus
Long-crested eagle, Lophaetus occipitalis
Lesser spotted eagle, Clanga pomarina
Wahlberg's eagle, Hieraaetus wahlbergi
Booted eagle, Hieraaetus pennatus
Ayres's hawk-eagle, Hieraaetus ayresii
Tawny eagle, Aquila rapax
Steppe eagle, Aquila nipalensis
Verreaux's eagle, Aquila verreauxii
African hawk-eagle, Aquila spilogaster
Lizard buzzard, Kaupifalco monogrammicus
Dark chanting-goshawk, Melierax metabates
Gabar goshawk, Micronisus gabar
Eurasian marsh-harrier, Circus aeruginosus
African marsh-harrier, Circus ranivorus
Pallid harrier, Circus macrourus
Montagu's harrier, Circus pygargus
African goshawk, Accipiter tachiro
Shikra, Accipiter badius
Little sparrowhawk, Accipiter minullus
Ovambo sparrowhawk, Accipiter ovampensis
Rufous-breasted sparrowhawk, Accipiter rufiventris
Black goshawk, Accipiter melanoleucus
Black kite, Milvus migrans
African fish-eagle, Haliaeetus vocifer
Common buzzard, Buteo buteo
Mountain buzzard, Buteo oreophilus
Augur buzzard, Buteo augur

Barn-owls
Order: StrigiformesFamily: Tytonidae

Barn-owls are medium to large owls with large heads and characteristic heart-shaped faces. They have long strong legs with powerful talons.

African grass-owl, Tyto capensis (A)
Barn owl, Tyto alba

Owls
Order: StrigiformesFamily: Strigidae

The typical owls are small to large solitary nocturnal birds of prey. They have large forward-facing eyes and ears, a hawk-like beak and a conspicuous circle of feathers around each eye called a facial disk.

Eurasian scops-owl, Otus scops
African scops-owl, Otus senegalensis
Southern white-faced owl, Ptilopsis granti
Cape eagle-owl, Bubo capensis (A)
Spotted eagle-owl, Bubo africanus
Verreaux's eagle-owl, Bubo lacteus
Pel's fishing owl, Scotopelia peli
Pearl-spotted owlet, Glaucidium perlatum
African barred owlet, Glaucidium capense
African wood-owl, Strix woodfordii
Marsh owl, Asio capensis

Mousebirds
Order: ColiiformesFamily: Coliidae

The mousebirds are slender greyish or brown birds with soft, hairlike body feathers and very long thin tails. They are arboreal and scurry through the leaves like rodents in search of berries, fruit and buds. They are acrobatic and can feed upside down. All species have strong claws and reversible outer toes. They also have crests and stubby bills.

Speckled mousebird, Colius striatus
Red-faced mousebird, Urocolius indicus

Trogons
Order: TrogoniformesFamily: Trogonidae

The family Trogonidae includes trogons and quetzals. Found in tropical woodlands worldwide, they feed on insects and fruit, and their broad bills and weak legs reflect their diet and arboreal habits. Although their flight is fast, they are reluctant to fly any distance. Trogons have soft, often colourful, feathers with distinctive male and female plumage.

Narina trogon, Apaloderma narina
Bar-tailed trogon, Apaloderma vittatum

Hoopoes
Order: BucerotiformesFamily: Upupidae

Hoopoes have black, white and orangey-pink colouring with a large erectile crest on their head.

Eurasian hoopoe, Upupa epops

Woodhoopoes and scimitarbills
Order: BucerotiformesFamily: Phoeniculidae

The woodhoopoes are related to the kingfishers, rollers and hoopoes. They most resemble the hoopoes with their long curved bills, used to probe for insects, and short rounded wings. However, they differ in that they have metallic plumage, often blue, green or purple, and lack an erectile crest.

Green woodhoopoe, Phoeniculus purpureus
Common scimitarbill, Rhinopomastus cyanomelas

Ground-hornbills
Order:Bucerotiformes Family: Bucorvidae

The ground-hornbills are terrestrial birds which feed almost entirely on insects, other birds, snakes, and amphibians.

Southern ground-hornbill, Bucorvus leadbeateri

Hornbills
Order: BucerotiformesFamily: Bucerotidae

Hornbills are a group of birds whose bill is shaped like a cow's horn, but without a twist, sometimes with a casque on the upper mandible. Frequently, the bill is brightly coloured.

Crowned hornbill, Lophoceros alboterminatus
African gray hornbill, Lophoceros nasutus
Pale-billed hornbill, Lophoceros pallidirostris
Southern yellow-billed hornbill, Tockus leucomelas
Southern red-billed hornbill, Tockus rufirostris
Silvery-cheeked hornbill, Bycanistes brevis
Trumpeter hornbill, Bycanistes bucinator

Kingfishers
Order: CoraciiformesFamily: Alcedinidae

Kingfishers are medium-sized birds with large heads, long, pointed bills, short legs and stubby tails.

Half-collared kingfisher, Alcedo semitorquata
Malachite kingfisher, Corythornis cristatus
African pygmy kingfisher, Ispidina picta
Gray-headed kingfisher, Halcyon leucocephala
Woodland kingfisher, Halcyon senegalensis
Brown-hooded kingfisher, Halcyon albiventris
Striped kingfisher, Halcyon chelicuti
Giant kingfisher, Megaceryle maximus
Pied kingfisher, Ceryle rudis

Bee-eaters
Order: CoraciiformesFamily: Meropidae

The bee-eaters are a group of near passerine birds in the family Meropidae. Most species are found in Africa but others occur in southern Europe, Madagascar, Australia and New Guinea. They are characterised by richly coloured plumage, slender bodies and usually elongated central tail feathers. All are colourful and have long downturned bills and pointed wings, which give them a swallow-like appearance when seen from afar.

White-fronted bee-eater, Merops bullockoides
Little bee-eater, Merops pusillus
Swallow-tailed bee-eater, Merops hirundineus
Böhm's bee-eater, Merops boehmi
Blue-cheeked bee-eater, Merops persicus
Madagascar bee-eater, Merops superciliosus
European bee-eater, Merops apiaster
Southern carmine bee-eater, Merops nubicoides

Rollers
Order: CoraciiformesFamily: Coraciidae

Rollers resemble crows in size and build, but are more closely related to the kingfishers and bee-eaters. They share the colourful appearance of those groups with blues and browns predominating. The two inner front toes are connected, but the outer toe is not.

European roller, Coracias garrulus
Lilac-breasted roller, Coracias caudatus
Racket-tailed roller, Coracias spatulatus
Rufous-crowned roller, Coracias naevius
Broad-billed roller, Eurystomus glaucurus

African barbets
Order: PiciformesFamily: Lybiidae

The African barbets are plump birds, with short necks and large heads. They get their name from the bristles which fringe their heavy bills. Most species are brightly coloured.

Crested barbet, Trachyphonus vaillantii
White-eared barbet, Stactolaema leucotis
Whyte's barbet, Stactolaema whytii
Green barbet, Stactolaema olivacea
Green tinkerbird, Pogoniulus simplex
Moustached tinkerbird, Pogoniulus leucomystax
Yellow-rumped tinkerbird, Pogoniulus bilineatus
Yellow-fronted tinkerbird, Pogoniulus chrysoconus
Miombo barbet, Tricholaema frontata
Black-collared barbet, Lybius torquatus
Brown-breasted barbet, Lybius melanopterus
Black-backed barbet, Lybius minor

Honeyguides
Order: PiciformesFamily: Indicatoridae

Honeyguides are among the few birds that feed on wax. They are named for the greater honeyguide which leads traditional honey-hunters to bees' nests and, after the hunters have harvested the honey, feeds on the remaining contents of the hive.

Green-backed honeyguide, Prodotiscus zambesiae
Wahlberg's honeyguide, Prodotiscus regulus
Pallid honeyguide, Indicator meliphilus
Lesser honeyguide, Indicator minor
Scaly-throated honeyguide, Indicator variegatus
Greater honeyguide, Indicator indicator

Woodpeckers
Order: PiciformesFamily: Picidae

Woodpeckers are small to medium-sized birds with chisel-like beaks, short legs, stiff tails and long tongues used for capturing insects. Some species have feet with two toes pointing forward and two backward, while several species have only three toes. Many woodpeckers have the habit of tapping noisily on tree trunks with their beaks.

Cardinal woodpecker, Chloropicus fuscescens
Bearded woodpecker, Chloropicus namaquus
Stierling's woodpecker, Chloropicus stierlingi
Olive woodpecker, Chloropicus griseocephalus
Brown-eared woodpecker, Campethera caroli
Green-backed woodpecker, Campethera cailliautii
Bennett's woodpecker, Campethera bennettii
Reichenow's woodpecker, Campethera scriptoricauda
Golden-tailed woodpecker, Campethera abingoni

Falcons
Order: FalconiformesFamily: Falconidae

Falconidae is a family of diurnal birds of prey. They differ from hawks, eagles and kites in that they kill with their beaks instead of their talons.

Lesser kestrel, Falco naumanni
Rock kestrel, Falco rupicolus
Gray kestrel, Falco ardosiaceus (A)
Dickinson's kestrel, Falco dickinsoni
Red-necked falcon, Falco chicquera
Red-footed falcon, Falco vespertinus
Amur falcon, Falco amurensis
Eleonora's falcon, Falco eleonorae
Sooty falcon, Falco concolor (A)
Eurasian hobby, Falco subbuteo
African hobby, Falco cuvierii (A)
Lanner falcon, Falco biarmicus
Peregrine falcon, Falco peregrinus
Taita falcon, Falco fasciinucha

Old World parrots
Order: PsittaciformesFamily: Psittaculidae

Characteristic features of parrots include a strong curved bill, an upright stance, strong legs, and clawed zygodactyl feet. Many parrots are vividly colored, and some are multi-colored. Old World parrots are found from Africa east across south and southeast Asia and Oceania to Australia and New Zealand.

Lilian's lovebird, Agapornis lilianae

African and New World parrots
Order: PsittaciformesFamily: Psittacidae

Characteristic features of parrots include a strong curved bill, an upright stance, strong legs, and clawed zygodactyl feet. Many parrots are vividly colored, and some are multi-colored. Most of the species in this family are found in the New World.

Brown-necked parrot, Poicephalus robustus
Meyer's parrot, Poicephalus meyeri
Brown-headed parrot, Poicephalus cryptoxanthus

African and green broadbills
Order: PasseriformesFamily: Calyptomenidae

The broadbills are small, brightly coloured birds, which feed on fruit and also take insects in flycatcher fashion, snapping their broad bills. Their habitat is canopies of wet forests.

African broadbill, Smithornis capensis

Pittas
Order: PasseriformesFamily: Pittidae

Pittas are medium-sized by passerine standards and are stocky, with fairly long, strong legs, short tails and stout bills. Many are brightly coloured. They spend the majority of their time on wet forest floors, eating snails, insects and similar invertebrates. There are 32 species worldwide and 1 species which occurs in Malawi.

African pitta, Pitta angolensis

Cuckooshrikes
Order: PasseriformesFamily: Campephagidae

The cuckooshrikes are small to medium-sized passerine birds. They are predominantly greyish with white and black, although some species are brightly coloured.

Gray cuckooshrike, Coracina caesia
White-breasted cuckooshrike, Coracina pectoralis
Black cuckooshrike, Campephaga flava

Old World orioles
Order: PasseriformesFamily: Oriolidae

The Old World orioles are colourful passerine birds. They are not related to the New World orioles.

Eurasian golden oriole, Oriolus oriolus
African golden oriole, Oriolus auratus
Green-headed oriole, Oriolus chlorocephalus
African black-headed oriole, Oriolus larvatus

Wattle-eyes and batises
Order: PasseriformesFamily: Platysteiridae

The wattle-eyes, or puffback flycatchers, are small stout passerine birds of the African tropics. They get their name from the brightly coloured fleshy eye decorations found in most species in this group.

Black-throated wattle-eye, Platysteira peltata
Short-tailed batis, Batis mixta
Dark batis, Batis crypta (E)
Cape batis, Batis capensis
Woodward's batis, Batis fratrum
Chinspot batis, Batis molitor
Pale batis, Batis soror

Vangas, helmetshrikes, and allies
Order: PasseriformesFamily: Vangidae

The helmetshrikes are similar in build to the shrikes, but tend to be colourful species with distinctive crests or other head ornaments, such as wattles, from which they get their name.

White helmetshrike, Prionops plumatus
Retz's helmetshrike, Prionops retzii
Chestnut-fronted helmetshrike, Prionops scopifrons
Black-and-white shrike-flycatcher, Bias musicus

Bushshrikes and allies
Order: PasseriformesFamily: Malaconotidae

Bushshrikes are similar in habits to shrikes, hunting insects and other small prey from a perch on a bush. Although similar in build to the shrikes, these tend to be either colourful species or largely black; some species are quite secretive.

Brubru, Nilaus afer
Black-backed puffback, Dryoscopus cubla
Marsh tchagra, Tchagra minuta
Black-crowned tchagra, Tchagra senegala
Brown-crowned tchagra, Tchagra australis
Tropical boubou, Laniarius major
Southern boubou, Laniarius ferrugineus
Fülleborn's boubou, Laniarius fuelleborni
Sulphur-breasted bushshrike, Telophorus sulfureopectus
Olive bushshrike, Telophorus olivaceus
Black-fronted bushshrike, Telophorus nigrifrons
Four-colored bushshrike, Telophorus viridis
Gray-headed bushshrike, Malaconotus blanchoti

Drongos
Order: PasseriformesFamily: Dicruridae

The drongos are mostly black or dark grey in colour, sometimes with metallic tints. They have long forked tails, and some Asian species have elaborate tail decorations. They have short legs and sit very upright when perched, like a shrike. They flycatch or take prey from the ground.

Common square-tailed drongo, Dicrurus ludwigii
Fork-tailed drongo, Dicrurus adsimilis

Monarch flycatchers
Order: PasseriformesFamily: Monarchidae

The monarch flycatchers are small to medium-sized insectivorous passerines which hunt by flycatching. 
African crested-flycatcher, Trochocercus cyanomelas
African paradise-flycatcher, Terpsiphone viridis

Shrikes
Order: PasseriformesFamily: Laniidae

Shrikes are passerine birds known for their habit of catching other birds and small animals and impaling the uneaten portions of their bodies on thorns. A typical shrike's beak is hooked, like a bird of prey.

Red-backed shrike, Lanius collurio
Red-tailed shrike, Lanius phoenicuroides (A)
Lesser gray shrike, Lanius minor
Magpie shrike, Lanius melanoleucus
Northern fiscal, Lanius humeralis
Southern fiscal, Lanius collaris
Souza's shrike, Lanius souzae

Crows, jays, and magpies
Order: PasseriformesFamily: Corvidae

The family Corvidae includes crows, ravens, jays, choughs, magpies, treepies, nutcrackers and ground jays. Corvids are above average in size among the Passeriformes, and some of the larger species show high levels of intelligence.

Pied crow, Corvus albus
White-necked raven, Corvus albicollis

Hyliotas
Order: PasseriformesFamily: Hyliotidae

The members of this small family, all of genus Hyliota, are birds of the forest canopy. They tend to feed in mixed-species flocks.

Yellow-bellied hyliota, Hyliota flavigaster
Southern hyliota, Hyliota australis

Fairy flycatchers
Order: PasseriformesFamily: Stenostiridae

Most of the species of this small family are found in Africa, though a few inhabit tropical Asia. They are not closely related to other birds called "flycatchers".

African blue flycatcher, Elminia longicauda
White-tailed blue flycatcher, Elminia albicauda
White-tailed crested-flycatcher, Elminia albonotata

Tits, chickadees, and titmice
Order: PasseriformesFamily: Paridae

The Paridae are mainly small stocky woodland species with short stout bills. Some have crests. They are adaptable birds, with a mixed diet including seeds and insects.

White-winged black-tit, Melaniparus leucomelas
Rufous-bellied tit, Melaniparus rufiventris
Southern black-tit, Melaniparus niger
Carp's tit, Melaniparus carpi (A)
Miombo tit, Melaniparus griseiventris

Penduline-tits
Order: PasseriformesFamily: Remizidae

The penduline tits are a group of small passerine birds related to the true tits. They are insectivores.

African penduline-tit, Anthoscopus caroli

Larks
Order: PasseriformesFamily: Alaudidae

Larks are small terrestrial birds with often extravagant songs and display flights. Most larks are fairly dull in appearance. Their food is insects and seeds.

Dusky lark, Pinarocorys nigricans (A)
Chestnut-backed sparrow-lark, Eremopterix leucotis
Fischer's sparrow-lark, Eremopterix leucopareia
Rufous-naped lark, Mirafra africana
Flappet lark, Mirafra rufocinnamomea
Red-capped lark, Calandrella cinerea

Nicators
Order: PasseriformesFamily: Nicatoridae

The nicators are shrike-like, with hooked bills. They are endemic to sub-Saharan Africa.

Eastern nicator, Nicator gularis

African warblers
Order: PasseriformesFamily: Macrosphenidae

African warblers are small to medium-sized insectivores which are found in a wide variety of habitats south of the Sahara.

Red-capped crombec, Sylvietta ruficapilla
Red-faced crombec, Sylvietta whytii
Cape crombec, Sylvietta rufescens
Moustached grass-warbler, Melocichla mentalis

Cisticolas and allies
Order: PasseriformesFamily: Cisticolidae

The Cisticolidae are warblers found mainly in warmer southern regions of the Old World. They are generally very small birds of drab brown or grey appearance found in open country such as grassland or scrub.

Yellow-bellied eremomela, Eremomela icteropygialis
Greencap eremomela, Eremomela scotops
Burnt-neck eremomela, Eremomela usticollis
Long-billed tailorbird, Artisornis moreaui
Miombo wren-warbler, Calamonastes undosus
Stierling's wren-warbler, Calamonastes stierlingi
Green-backed camaroptera, Camaroptera brachyura
Bar-throated apalis, Apalis thoracica
Yellow-throated apalis, Apalis flavigularis
White-winged apalis, Apalis chariessa
Yellow-breasted apalis, Apalis flavida
Rudd's apalis, Apalis ruddi
Chestnut-throated apalis, Apalis porphyrolaema
Chapin's apalis, Apalis chapini
Black-headed apalis, Apalis melanocephala
Brown-headed apalis, Apalis alticola
Tawny-flanked prinia, Prinia subflava
Red-winged prinia, Prinia erythroptera
Red-faced cisticola, Cisticola erythrops
Singing cisticola, Cisticola cantans
Trilling cisticola, Cisticola woosnami
Hunter's cisticola, Cisticola hunteri
Black-lored cisticola, Cisticola nigriloris
Rock-loving cisticola, Cisticola aberrans
Rattling cisticola, Cisticola chiniana
Tinkling cisticola, Cisticola rufilatus
Wailing cisticola, Cisticola lais
Churring cisticola, Cisticola njombe
Winding cisticola, Cisticola marginatus
Rufous-winged cisticola, Cisticola galactotes
Levaillant's cisticola, Cisticola tinniens
Croaking cisticola, Cisticola natalensis
Piping cisticola, Cisticola fulvicapillus
Siffling cisticola, Cisticola brachypterus
Zitting cisticola, Cisticola juncidis
Wing-snapping cisticola, Cisticola ayresii

Reed warblers and allies
Order: PasseriformesFamily: Acrocephalidae

The members of this family are usually rather large for "warblers". Most are rather plain olivaceous brown above with much yellow to beige below. They are usually found in open woodland, reedbeds, or tall grass. The family occurs mostly in southern to western Eurasia and surroundings, but it also ranges far into the Pacific, with some species in Africa.

African yellow-warbler, Iduna natalensis
Mountain yellow-warbler, Iduna similis
Olive-tree warbler, Hippolais olivetorum
Icterine warbler, Hippolais icterina
Sedge warbler, Acrocephalus schoenobaenus
Marsh warbler, Acrocephalus palustris
Common reed warbler, Acrocephalus scirpaceus
Basra reed warbler, Acrocephalus griseldis
Lesser swamp warbler, Acrocephalus gracilirostris
Great reed warbler, Acrocephalus arundinaceus

Grassbirds and allies
Order: PasseriformesFamily: Locustellidae

Locustellidae are a family of small insectivorous songbirds found mainly in Eurasia, Africa, and the Australian region. They are smallish birds with tails that are usually long and pointed, and tend to be drab brownish or buffy all over.

River warbler, Locustella fluviatilis
Fan-tailed grassbird, Catriscus brevirostris
Evergreen-forest warbler, Bradypterus lopezi
Cinnamon bracken-warbler, Bradypterus cinnamomeus
Little rush-warbler, Bradypterus baboecala

Swallows
Order: PasseriformesFamily: Hirundinidae

The family Hirundinidae is adapted to aerial feeding. They have a slender streamlined body, long pointed wings and a short bill with a wide gape. The feet are adapted to perching rather than walking, and the front toes are partially joined at the base.

Plain martin, Riparia paludicola
Bank swallow, Riparia riparia
Banded martin, Neophedina cincta
Mascarene martin, Phedina borbonica
Rock martin, Ptyonoprogne fuligula
Barn swallow, Hirundo rustica
Angola swallow, Hirundo angolensis
White-throated swallow, Hirundo albigularis
Wire-tailed swallow, Hirundo smithii
Pearl-breasted swallow, Hirundo dimidiata
Montane blue swallow, Hirundo atrocaerulea
Greater striped swallow, Cecropis cucullata (A)
Red-rumped swallow, Cecropis daurica
Lesser striped swallow, Cecropis abyssinica
Rufous-chested swallow, Cecropis semirufa
Mosque swallow, Cecropis senegalensis
South African swallow, Petrochelidon spilodera (A)
Common house-martin, Delichon urbicum
White-headed sawwing, Psalidoprocne albiceps
Black sawwing, Psalidoprocne pristoptera
Gray-rumped swallow, Pseudhirundo griseopyga

Bulbuls
Order: PasseriformesFamily: Pycnonotidae

Bulbuls are medium-sized songbirds. Some are colourful with yellow, red or orange vents, cheeks, throats or supercilia, but most are drab, with uniform olive-brown to black plumage. Some species have distinct crests.

Sombre greenbul, Andropadus importunus
Shelley's greenbul, Arizelocichla masukuensis
Eastern mountain greenbul, Arizelocichla nigriceps
Black-browed mountain greenbul, Arizelocichla fusciceps
Stripe-cheeked greenbul, Arizelocichla milanjensis
Yellow-bellied greenbul, Chlorocichla flaviventris
Yellow-throated greenbul, Atimastillas flavicollis
Little greenbul, Eurillas virens
Terrestrial brownbul, Phyllastrephus terrestris
Gray-olive greenbul, Phyllastrephus cerviniventris
Cabanis's greenbul, Phyllastrephus cabanisi
Yellow-streaked bulbul, Phyllastrephus flavostriatus
Common bulbul, Pycnonotus barbatus

Leaf warblers
Order: PasseriformesFamily: Phylloscopidae

Leaf warblers are a family of small insectivorous birds found mostly in Eurasia and ranging into Wallacea and Africa. The species are of various sizes, often green-plumaged above and yellow below, or more subdued with grayish-green to grayish-brown colors.

Willow warbler, Phylloscopus trochilus
Yellow-throated woodland-warbler, Phylloscopus ruficapilla

Bush warblers and allies
Order: PasseriformesFamily: Scotocercidae

The members of this family are found throughout Africa, Asia, and Polynesia. Their taxonomy is in flux, and some authorities place genus Erythrocerus in another family.

Livingstone's flycatcher, Erythrocercus livingstonei

Sylviid warblers, parrotbills, and allies
Order: PasseriformesFamily: Sylviidae
The family Sylviidae is a group of small insectivorous passerine birds. They mainly occur as breeding species, as the common name implies, in Europe, Asia and, to a lesser extent, Africa. Most are of generally undistinguished appearance, but many have distinctive songs.

Eurasian blackcap, Sylvia atricapilla
Garden warbler, Sylvia borin
African hill babbler, Sylvia abyssinica
Barred warbler, Curruca nisoria (A)
Brown parisoma, Curruca lugens
Greater whitethroat, Curruca communis

White-eyes, yuhinas, and allies
Order: PasseriformesFamily: Zosteropidae

The white-eyes are small and mostly undistinguished, their plumage above being generally some dull colour like greenish-olive, but some species have a white or bright yellow throat, breast or lower parts, and several have buff flanks. As their name suggests, many species have a white ring around each eye.

Southern yellow white-eye, Zosterops anderssoni

Ground babblers and allies
Order: PasseriformesFamily: Pellorneidae

These small to medium-sized songbirds have soft fluffy plumage but are otherwise rather diverse. Members of the genus Illadopsis are found in forests, but some other genera are birds of scrublands.

Mountain illadopsis, Illadopsis pyrrhoptera

Laughingthrushes and allies
Order: PasseriformesFamily: Leiothrichidae

The members of this family are diverse in size and coloration, though those of genus Turdoides tend to be brown or grayish. The family is found in Africa, India, and southeast Asia.

Arrow-marked babbler, Turdoides jardineii

Treecreepers
Order: PasseriformesFamily: Certhiidae

Treecreepers are small woodland birds, brown above and white below. They have thin pointed down-curved bills, which they use to extricate insects from bark. They have stiff tail feathers, like woodpeckers, which they use to support themselves on vertical trees.

African spotted creeper, Salpornis salvadori

Oxpeckers
Order: PasseriformesFamily: Buphagidae

As both the English and scientific names of these birds imply, they feed on ectoparasites, primarily ticks, found on large mammals.

Red-billed oxpecker, Buphagus erythrorhynchus
Yellow-billed oxpecker, Buphagus africanus

Starlings
Order: PasseriformesFamily: Sturnidae

Starlings are small to medium-sized passerine birds. Their flight is strong and direct and they are very gregarious. Their preferred habitat is fairly open country. They eat insects and fruit. Plumage is typically dark with a metallic sheen.

Wattled starling, Creatophora cinerea
Violet-backed starling, Cinnyricinclus leucogaster
Slender-billed starling, Onychognathus tenuirostris
Neumann's starling, Onychognathus neumanni
Red-winged starling, Onychognathus morio
Waller's starling, Onychognathus walleri
Babbling starling, Neocichla gutturalis
Sharpe's starling, Pholia sharpii (A)
Meves's starling, Lamprotornis mevesii
Lesser blue-eared starling, Lamprotornis chloropterus
Greater blue-eared starling, Lamprotornis chalybaeus

Thrushes and allies
Order: PasseriformesFamily: Turdidae

The thrushes are a group of passerine birds that occur mainly in the Old World. They are plump, soft plumaged, small to medium-sized insectivores or sometimes omnivores, often feeding on the ground. Many have attractive songs.

Spotted ground-thrush, Geokichla guttata
Orange ground-thrush, Geokichla gurneyi
Groundscraper thrush, Turdus litsitsirupa
Abyssinian thrush, Turdus abyssinicus
Kurrichane thrush, Turdus libonyana
Olive thrush, Turdus olivaceus

Old World flycatchers
Order: PasseriformesFamily: Muscicapidae

Old World flycatchers and chats are a large group of small passerine birds native to the Old World. They are mainly small insectivores. The appearance of these birds is highly varied, but they mostly have weak songs and harsh calls.

African dusky flycatcher, Muscicapa adusta
Spotted flycatcher, Muscicapa striata
Böhm's flycatcher, Bradornis boehmi
Pale flycatcher, Agricola pallidus
Gray tit-flycatcher, Fraseria plumbea
Ashy flycatcher, Fraseria caerulescens
Southern black-flycatcher, Melaenornis pammelaina
White-eyed slaty-flycatcher, Melaenornis fischeri
Bearded scrub-robin, Cercotrichas quadrivirgata
Miombo scrub-robin, Cercotrichas barbata
Rufous-tailed scrub-robin, Cercotrichas galactotes (A)
Red-backed scrub-robin, Cercotrichas leucophrys
Olive-flanked robin-chat, Cossypha anomala
Cape robin-chat, Cossypha caffra
White-browed robin-chat, Cossypha heuglini
Red-capped robin-chat, Cossypha natalensis
Collared palm-thrush, Cichladusa arquata
White-starred robin, Pogonocichla stellata
Cholo alethe, Chamaetylas choloensis
White-chested alethe, Chamaetylas fuelleborni
Sharpe's akalat, Sheppardia sharpei
East coast akalat, Sheppardia gunningi
Thrush nightingale, Luscinia luscinia
Collared flycatcher, Ficedula albicollis
Miombo rock-thrush, Monticola angolensis
Whinchat, Saxicola rubetra
African stonechat, Saxicola torquatus
Mocking cliff-chat, Thamnolaea cinnamomeiventris
Arnot's chat, Myrmecocichla arnotti
Northern wheatear, Oenanthe oenanthe
Capped wheatear, Oenanthe pileata
Familiar chat, Oenanthe familiaris
Boulder chat, Pinarornis plumosus

Dapple-throat and allies
Order: PasseriformesFamily: Modulatricidae

This species and two others, all of different genera, were formerly placed in family Promeropidae, the sugarbirds, but were accorded their own family in 2017.

Spot-throat, Modulatrix stictigula

Sunbirds and spiderhunters
Order: PasseriformesFamily: Nectariniidae

The sunbirds and spiderhunters are very small passerine birds which feed largely on nectar, although they will also take insects, especially when feeding young. Flight is fast and direct on their short wings. Most species can take nectar by hovering like a hummingbird, but usually perch to feed.

Anchieta's sunbird, Anthreptes anchietae
Western violet-backed sunbird, Anthreptes longuemarei
Collared sunbird, Hedydipna collaris
Green-headed sunbird, Cyanomitra verticalis
Olive sunbird, Cyanomitra olivacea
Mouse-colored sunbird, Cyanomitra veroxii
Amethyst sunbird, Chalcomitra amethystina
Scarlet-chested sunbird, Chalcomitra senegalensis
Bronze sunbird, Nectarinia kilimensis
Malachite sunbird, Nectarinia famosa
Red-tufted sunbird, Nectarinia johnstoni
Western Miombo sunbird, Cinnyris gertrudis
Eastern Miombo sunbird, Cinnyris manoensis
Stuhlmann's sunbird, Cinnyris stuhlmanni
Montane double-collared sunbird, Cinnyris ludovicensis
Forest double-collared sunbird, Cinnyris fuelleborni
Shelley's sunbird, Cinnyris shelleyi
Purple-banded sunbird, Cinnyris bifasciatus
Oustalet's sunbird, Cinnyris oustaleti
White-breasted sunbird, Cinnyris talatala
Variable sunbird, Cinnyris venustus
Copper sunbird, Cinnyris cupreus

Weavers and allies
Order: PasseriformesFamily: Ploceidae

The weavers are small passerine birds related to the finches. They are seed-eating birds with rounded conical bills. The males of many species are brightly coloured, usually in red or yellow and black, some species show variation in colour only in the breeding season.

White-headed buffalo-weaver, Dinemellia dinemelli
White-browed sparrow-weaver, Plocepasser mahali
Chestnut-backed sparrow-weaver, Plocepasser rufoscapulatus
Red-headed weaver, Anaplectes rubriceps
Bertram's weaver, Ploceus bertrandi
Baglafecht weaver, Ploceus baglafecht
Spectacled weaver, Ploceus ocularis
African golden-weaver, Ploceus subaureus
Holub's golden-weaver, Ploceus xanthops
Southern brown-throated weaver, Ploceus xanthopterus
Lesser masked-weaver, Ploceus intermedius
Southern masked-weaver, Ploceus velatus
Village weaver, Ploceus cucullatus
Forest weaver, Ploceus bicolor
Olive-headed weaver, Ploceus olivaceiceps
Cardinal quelea, Quelea cardinalis
Red-headed quelea, Quelea erythrops
Red-billed quelea, Quelea quelea
Southern red bishop, Euplectes orix
Black-winged bishop, Euplectes hordeaceus
Yellow bishop, Euplectes capensis
White-winged widowbird, Euplectes albonotatus
Yellow-mantled widowbird, Euplectes macroura
Red-collared widowbird, Euplectes ardens
Fan-tailed widowbird, Euplectes axillaris
Buff-shouldered widowbird, Euplectes psammocromius
Grosbeak weaver, Amblyospiza albifrons

Waxbills and allies
Order: PasseriformesFamily: Estrildidae

The estrildid finches are small passerine birds of the Old World tropics and Australasia. They are gregarious and often colonial seed eaters with short thick but pointed bills. They are all similar in structure and habits, but have wide variation in plumage colours and patterns.

Bronze mannikin, Spermestes cucullatus
Magpie mannikin, Spermestes fringilloides
Black-and-white mannikin, Spermestes bicolor
Yellow-bellied waxbill, Coccopygia quartinia
Green-backed twinspot, Mandingoa nitidula
Red-faced crimsonwing, Cryptospiza reichenovii
Black-tailed waxbill, Glaucestrilda perreini
Fawn-breasted waxbill, Estrilda paludicola
Common waxbill, Estrilda astrild
Crimson-rumped waxbill, Estrilda rhodopyga
Quailfinch, Ortygospiza atricollis
Locustfinch, Paludipasser locustella
Cut-throat, Amadina fasciata
Zebra waxbill, Amandava subflava
Southern cordonbleu, Uraeginthus angolensis
Lesser seedcracker, Pyrenestes minor
Green-winged pytilia, Pytilia melba
Orange-winged pytilia, Pytilia afra
Peters's twinspot, Hypargos niveoguttatus
Red-billed firefinch, Lagonosticta senegala
African firefinch, Lagonosticta rubricata
Jameson's firefinch, Lagonosticta rhodopareia
Brown firefinch, Lagonosticta nitidula

Indigobirds
Order: PasseriformesFamily: Viduidae

The indigobirds are finch-like species which usually have black or indigo predominating in their plumage. All are brood parasites, which lay their eggs in the nests of estrildid finches.

Pin-tailed whydah, Vidua macroura
Broad-tailed paradise-whydah, Vidua obtusa
Eastern paradise-whydah, Vidua paradisaea
Village indigobird, Vidua chalybeata
Variable indigobird, Vidua funerea
Purple indigobird, Vidua purpurascens
Green indigobird, Vidua codringtoni
Parasitic weaver, Anomalospiza imberbis

Old World sparrows
Order: PasseriformesFamily: Passeridae

Old World sparrows are small passerine birds. In general, sparrows tend to be small, plump, brown or grey birds with short tails and short powerful beaks. Sparrows are seed eaters, but they also consume small insects.

House sparrow, Passer domesticus (I)
Northern gray-headed sparrow, Passer griseus
Swahili sparrow, Passer suahelicus
Southern gray-headed sparrow, Passer diffusus
Yellow-throated bush sparrow, Gymnoris superciliaris

Wagtails and pipits
Order: PasseriformesFamily: Motacillidae

Motacillidae is a family of small passerine birds with medium to long tails. They include the wagtails, longclaws and pipits. They are slender, ground feeding insectivores of open country.

Mountain wagtail, Motacilla clara
Gray wagtail, Motacilla cinerea
Western yellow wagtail, Motacilla flava
African pied wagtail, Motacilla aguimp
White wagtail, Motacilla alba (A)
African pipit, Anthus cinnamomeus
Woodland pipit, Anthus nyassae
Long-billed pipit, Anthus similis
Plain-backed pipit, Anthus leucophrys
Buffy pipit, Anthus vaalensis
Striped pipit, Anthus lineiventris
Tree pipit, Anthus trivialis
Bush pipit, Anthus caffer
Golden pipit, Tmetothylacus tenellus (A)
Yellow-throated longclaw, Macronyx croceus
Rosy-throated longclaw, Macronyx ameliae

Finches, euphonias, and allies
Order: PasseriformesFamily: Fringillidae

Finches are seed-eating passerine birds, that are small to moderately large and have a strong beak, usually conical and in some species very large. All have twelve tail feathers and nine primaries. These birds have a bouncing flight with alternating bouts of flapping and gliding on closed wings, and most sing well.

Oriole finch, Linurgus olivaceus
Yellow-fronted canary, Crithagra mozambica
Southern citril, Crithagra hyposticuta
Lemon-breasted seedeater, Crithagra citrinipectus
Brimstone canary, Crithagra sulphurata
Yellow-browed seedeater, Crithagra whytii
Black-eared seedeater, Crithagra mennelli
Reichard's seedeater, Crithagra reichardi
Yellow-crowned canary, Serinus flavivertex

Old World buntings
Order: PasseriformesFamily: Emberizidae

The emberizids are a large family of passerine birds. They are seed-eating birds with distinctively shaped bills. Many emberizid species have distinctive head patterns.

Cabanis's bunting, Emberiza cabanisi
Golden-breasted bunting, Emberiza flaviventris
Cape bunting, Emberiza capensis
Vincent's bunting, Emberiza vincenti
Cinnamon-breasted bunting, Emberiza tahapisi

See also
List of birds
Lists of birds by region

References

 African Bird Club & Dowsett, Bob (2007) Checklist of the Birds of Malawi. Retrieved on 30 December 2007.

 Dowsett-Lemaire, Françoise & Dowsett, Robert J. (2006) The Birds of Malawi, Tauraco Press & Aves, Liège, Belgium.

External links
Birds of Malawi - World Institute for Conservation and Environment

Malawi
'Malawi
Malawi
birds